Dudley James Milligan (7 January 1916 – 1971) was a footballer who represented both South Africa and Ireland at international level. Milligan, who played as a forward, played professionally in Scotland, England, and Ireland between 1937 and 1949.

Club career
Born in Johannesburg, Dudley began his career with hometown side Johannesburg Rangers before going on trial with Scottish club Dundee in 1937. He then played professionally for Clyde and Chesterfield; during World War II, normal League football was suspended, and Milligan guested for a number of teams in Ireland including Linfield, Larne, Distillery and Dundalk. After the League resumed in 1946, Milligan returned to Chesterfield, before moving to Bournemouth & Boscombe Athletic in August 1947. By October 1948 Milligan had moved to Walsall, and in 1949 he returned to Ireland to play with Ballymena United.

International career
Milligan played international football for both South Africa and Ireland.

References

1916 births
1971 deaths
South African soccer players
South Africa international soccer players
South African expatriate soccer players
Association footballers from Northern Ireland
Pre-1950 IFA international footballers
Clyde F.C. players
Chesterfield F.C. players
AFC Bournemouth players
Walsall F.C. players
Linfield F.C. players
Larne F.C. players
Lisburn Distillery F.C. players
Dundalk F.C. players
Ballymena United F.C. players
Scottish Football League players
English Football League players
Association football forwards